Eversberg is a town with about 2000 inhabitants in the county of North Rhine-Westphalia, Germany.

The history of the town goes back to the 11th century when Count Eberhard von Arnsberg founded the castle Eversberg. The castle today is a ruin. The town is well known for its delightful historical local centre with timber-framed houses. In 1981 Eversberg won the national prize "Unser Dorf soll schöner werden" as one of the most beautiful towns in Germany. Since 1975 Eversberg has been part of the city of Meschede.

Towns in North Rhine-Westphalia